Blue Moon is a 2000 American comedy-drama film directed by John A. Gallagher and starring Ben Gazzara, Rita Moreno, Alanna Ubach, and Brian Vincent.

Cast
Ben Gazzara as Frank Cavallo
Rita Moreno as Maggie Cavallo
Alanna Ubach as Peggy
Brian Vincent as Mac
Burt Young as Bobby
Vincent Pastore as Joey
Mario Macaluso as Young Jimmy
Heather Matarazzo as Donna
Victor Argo as Tony
David Thornton as Frank's Father
Lillo Brancato Jr. as Pete
Shawn Elliott as The Ambassador

Reception
The film has a 20% rating on Rotten Tomatoes.

References

External links
 
 

American comedy-drama films
2000 comedy-drama films
2000 films
2000s English-language films
2000s American films